John Reginald Hamblin (18 March 1935 – 21 September 2022), known affectionately as "Funny John" or "Naughty John", was a British-born Australian children's television presenter and actor of stage and screen who appeared in theatre productions, soap operas and made-for-TV films.

Hamblin was a presenter on the Australian children's television program Play School for 29 years from 1970 to 1999. He featured in more than 350 episodes and became the second longest-serving presenter in the program's history after Benita Collings with whom he often presented.

Early life
Hamblin was born on 18 March 1935 in Ash, Surrey, England and grew up in Suffolk. When Hamblin's mother moved in with the local baker, his father moved the rest of the family to Norfolk. He lost contact with his mother at that point. Hamblin's father had flown with the Royal Flying Corps during World War I and Hamblin himself joined the Air Force and did his national service in Cyprus in the late 1950s before returning to England.

Hamblin initially trained at art school for six months but decided on a career in acting instead and studied drama to become an actor.

Career

Theatre
Hamblin started his acting career in England in repertory theatre with the Theatre Royal, Windsor. He also worked in old time music hall.

After emigrating to Australia, Hamblin continued to work in theatre over a 25-year period from 1970 until 1995, including Blithe Spirit and a stage show of Play School.

Hamblin also toured in the stage play Crown Matrimonial as King Edward VIII.

Television
In 1967, Hamblin made an appearance in the cult British TV series The Prisoner in the episode "A Change of Mind".

After migrating to Australia, Hamblin secured roles in television from the late 1960s until the late 1980s, including roles in soap operas, becoming notable for his role in series The Restless Years as A.R. Jordan. His TV credits also include Number 96, Class of '74, The Young Doctors (as Dr Dan Wheatley), Case for the Defence, and Sons and Daughters.

Hamblin played the role of Michael Chamberlain in the 1984 telemovie The Disappearance of Azaria Chamberlain. After a hiatus in the 1990s, he returned to TV series in guest roles in All Saints and Love My Way in the early 2000s.

Play School presenter
Known as being irreverent and inserting double-entendres into skits, Hamblin was the second most prolific presenter of Play School, appearing in 357 episodes from 1970 to 1999, while fellow presenter Benita Collings appeared in 401 episodes. On the show, Hamblin would sing, read stories, make crafts, play with the toys and educate children about such things as telling the time and the days of the week.

Hamblin returned briefly for a special guest appearance in 2016, as part of Play School'''s 50th anniversary special.

Personal life
Hamblin came to Australia in the 1960s as a "Ten Pound Pom" with his second wife, Wendy. After Play School, he retired and moved to Tasmania with his third wife, Jenny, whom he married in 1984. He had two children, Emma and Myles. He suffered a heart attack . In 2008, he published his memoirs, Open Wide, Come Inside'', with Peter Richman.

Hamblin died at a hospital in Sydney on 21 September 2022, aged 87.

Filmography

Presenter

References

External links

 

1935 births
2022 deaths
20th-century Australian male actors
Australian male film actors
Australian male television actors
English emigrants to Australia
Male actors from Suffolk
21st-century Australian male actors
Australian children's television presenters